The 2017 Algarve Cup was the 24th edition of the Algarve Cup, an invitational women's football tournament held annually in Portugal. It took place from 1 to 8 March.

Format
The twelve invited teams were split into three groups that played a round-robin tournament.

Points awarded in the group stage followed the standard formula of three points for a win, one point for a draw and zero points for a loss. In the case of two teams being tied on the same number of points in a group, their head-to-head result determined the higher place.

Teams

Venues
 Albufeira Municipal Stadium, Albufeira
 Bela Vista Municipal Stadium, Parchal
 Estádio Algarve
 Lagos Municipal Stadium, Lagos
 VRS António Sports Complex, Vila Real de Santo António

Referees

Squads

Group stage
The groups were announced on 18 November 2016,
All times WET (UTC±00:00).

Tie-breaking criteria
For the group stage of this tournament, where two or more teams in a group tied on an equal number of points, the finishing positions were determined by the following tie-breaking criteria in the following order:
 number of points obtained in the matches among the teams in question
 goal difference in all the group matches
 number of goals scored in all the group matches
 fair-play ranking in all the group matches
 FIFA ranking

Group A

Group B

Group C

Ranking of teams for placement matches
The ranking of the 1st, 2nd, 3rd, and 4th placed teams in each group to determine the placement matches:

1st placed teams

2nd placed teams

3rd placed teams

4th placed teams

Placement matches

11th Place

9th Place

7th Place

5th Place

3rd Place

Final

Final standings

Goalscorers
4 goals
 Pernille Harder
 Kumi Yokoyama
3 goals
 Emily Gielnik
2 goals

 Christine Sinclair
 Wang Shanshan
 Sarah Hansen
 Stine Larsen
 Sanne Troelsgaard Nielsen
 Málfríður Erna Sigurðardóttir 
 Yui Hasegawa
 Olga García
 Kosovare Asllani

1 goal

 Ellie Carpenter
 Alanna Kennedy
 Kyah Simon
 Sophie Schmidt
 Line Jensen
 Nicoline Sørensen
 Katrine Veje
 Gunnhildur Yrsa Jónsdóttir
 Mandy van den Berg
 Anouk Dekker
 Renate Jansen
 Lieke Martens
 Vivianne Miedema
 Sherida Spitse
 Ada Hegerberg
 Ingvild Isaksen 
 Guro Reiten
 Margarita Chernomyrdina
 Daria Makarenko
 Olesya Mashina
 Jennifer Hermoso
 Silvia Meseguer
 Leila Ouahabi
 Nilla Fischer
 Fridolina Rolfö
 Lotta Schelin

Own goal
 Rumi Utsugi (playing against Netherlands)
 Sheila van den Bulk (playing against Japan)
 Maria Thorisdottir (playing against Spain)

References

External links
 Algarve Cup's timedate

 
2017
2017 in women's association football
2016–17 in Portuguese football
March 2017 sports events in Europe
2017 in Portuguese women's sport